Sebree Island is an island in Muir Inlet, Glacier Bay in Alaska. It is named for United States Navy officer and Governor of American Samoa Rear Admiral  Uriel Sebree. Island also known as  Headland Island as it was called by Cushing in 1891 (p. 228). 
Sebree Peak is named for the same officer.

References

External links
 Sebree Island on Google Maps

Islands of the Alexander Archipelago
Islands of Hoonah–Angoon Census Area, Alaska
Islands of Alaska
Islands of Unorganized Borough, Alaska